Pat Priest may refer to:

 Pat Priest (actress) (born 1936), American actress
 Pat Priest (judge) (born 1940), Texas state court judge